John Lovel, 2nd Baron Lovel (died 24 Jun 1314), Lord of Titchmarsh, was an English noble. He was killed during the Battle of Bannockburn against the Scots on 23 or 24 June 1314.

He was the eldest son of John Lovel and Joan de Ros. John was summoned to Parliament in 1311. He was killed during the Battle of Bannockburn in 1314.

Marriage and issue
John married Maud, daughter of Philip Burnell and Maud filias John; they are known to have had the following known issue:
John Lovel
Joan Lovel

He also fathered a daughter named Isabel by a daughter of Lord Strange of Blackmere.

Citations

References
 
Cokayne, George Edward and H.A. Doubleday et al. eds. Complete Peerage of England, Scotland, Ireland, Great Britain and the United Kingdom. Volume VIII, 2nd edition. London, 1926.
 

Year of birth uncertain
1314 deaths